Mvurwi, originally known as Umvukwesi, is a town in Mashonaland Central province in Zimbabwe.

Some of Mvurwi's schools include Holy Rosary Primary and Secondary School, Mvurwi Primary and High School and Umvukwesi Primary School which is one of the town's most elite learning facilities and produces noteworthy results.

Previously, it fell within the breadbasket region (from Banket - Shamva) where much of foodstuffs and the golden leaf were being produced.  Majority of Mvurwians are small scale farmers who rely on the agro-based economy.  The industry sector has to be improved in future, currently it has got Delta Beverage brewing company and Mashonaland Tobacco Sales to mention a few.

Chiote/ Pembi Falls and Galiva are dams surrounding the borders of the town. It is still developing in terms of infrastructure.  It has other government offices such as R.G and major referral hospitals.

When it was accorded town status in 2007: as from that was headed by Mayor-Councilor Vincent Murengwa of the ruling party ZANU PF.

Mvurwi is a place which is primarily surrounded by farms and is conducive for farming. it is essential in the food production of the country.

References

Populated places in Mashonaland Central Province